There are three types of elections in Nepal: elections to the Federal Parliament, elections to the provincial assemblies and elections to the local government. Within each of these categories there may be by-elections as well as general elections. Currently three electoral systems are used: parallel voting for House of Representatives and provincial assemblies, Single transferable vote for National Assembly and first past the post for local elections.

History

Rana regime 
In 1947, the government of prime minister Padma Shumsher formed a Constitution Reform Committee under the leadership of General Bahadur Shamsher to reform the administration in the country. The Nepal Government Constitutional Law, 1948 envisioned a bicameral legislature with the lower house called Rastra Sabha to have 42 elected members in addition to 28 members nominated by the prime mininster. A provision was also included for an elected Village Panchayat with 5 to 15 members, an elected Municipal Panchayat with 10 to 50 members and an elected District Panchayat with 15 to 20 members. The elections for the bodies would be held on the basis of non-partisan democracy and all adults would have the right to franchise. The law was promulgated but never came into effect.

Transition era 
The Interim Administration Act of Nepal, 1952 promulgated by King Tribhuwan after the end of the Rana regime made provisions an Election Commission for the first time. The act also gave everyone in the country over the age of 21 a right to adult franchise. The Constitution of the Kingdom of Nepal 1959, prepared under the advice of Sir Ivor Jennings created 109 constituencies in the country and reiterated the right to adult franchise for everyone over the age of 21.

Constitutional monarchy era 
The constitution of 1990 had a provision for a bicameral parliament. The House of Representatives (lower house) and the National Assembly (upper house). The country was divided into 205 constituencies which would elected members to the House of Representatives for a term of five years. The National Assembly had 60 members, 35 of whom would be elected by the electoral college of the House of Representatives, 3 each from the five development regions of Nepal, 15 in total, which would be elected by an electoral college of village, municipalities and districts and 10 members appointed by the monarch. The right to franchise was also extended to everyone over the age of 18.

Post Civil War 
The Interim Constitution of Nepal, 2007, promulgated after 2006 revolution had provisions for a constituent assembly that would draft a new constitution for the newly formed republic. The country was divided into 240 constituencies which would elect members to the Constituent Assembly of Nepal. In addition to this 335 seats to the assembly were to be filled using a proportional representation system and a further 26 members would be appointed. The party list for the proportional voting had reservations for women, Dalits, Indigenous peoples, Madheshis and people from backward areas. Women would also have to make up one-third of the seats in the assembly.

Federal Democratic Republic of Nepal 
The Constitution of Nepal, 2015 that was drafted by the 2nd Nepalese Constituent Assembly has provisions for a bicameral legislature. The House of Representatives and the National Assembly would be the lower chamber and the upper chamber of the new Federal Parliament of Nepal. The country was divided into 165 constituencies which would elect members to the House of Representatives through first-past-the-post voting and a further 110 members would be elected through the party list proportional representation system. The provincial assemblies were also created for each of the seven provinces of Nepal. The assemblies would be unicameral and would elect 330 members through first-past-the-post voting and 220 members would be elected through the party list proportional representation system. The National Assembly would elect 56 members through an electoral college consisting of members of the lower house, provincial assemblies and the heads and deputy heads of each of the 753 local units in the country.

Election Commission
The Election Commission of Nepal is formed of five Election Commissioners, one of whom is Chief Election Commissioner and acts as the chairperson. They serve one term of six years and are appointed by the President on the recommendation of the Constitutional Council. The Chief Election Commissioners and other Election Commissioners must hold a bachelor's degree, must not belong to a political party immediately before their appointment, must have attained the age of forty-five and must possess high moral character.

The Election Commission conducts, supervises, directs and controls the elections for the President, Vice-president, Federal Parliament, State Legislature and local bodies. It prepares a voters' list for the purpose of the election and holds referendums on subjects of national importance as per the Constitution and Federal law.

Legislative elections 
Following the dissolution of parliament all the Members of Parliament forming the House of Representatives of the Federal Parliament of Nepal are elected. The term for the House of Representatives is five years, except when dissolved earlier. When the House of Representatives is dissolved the power of Federal Parliament is carried out by the National Assembly.

Candidates for each constituency are chosen by the political parties or stand as independents. Each constituency elects one MP under the first past the post system of election. Since Nepal uses a parallel voting system, voters cast another ballot to elect MPs through the party-list proportional representation. The current constitution specifies that 165 MPs are elected from the first past the post system and 110 MPs are elected through the party-list proportional representation system. Women should account for one third of total members elected from each party and if one-third percentage are not elected, the party that fails to ensure so shall have to elect one-third of total number as women through the party-list proportional representation.

A party with an overall majority (more seats than all other parties combined) following an election forms the government. If a party has no outright majority, parties can seek to form coalitions.

By-elections 

 1959 by-elections,
 Constituency 52 (Bara Mid-East)
 Constituency 70 (Thalara Doti North)
 Constituency 91 (Gulmi South-West)
 1992 by-elections, 9 February 1992
 Sunsari-2
 Kathmandu 5
 1994 by-elections, 7 February 1994
 Jhapa-1
 Kathmandu 1

 1997 by-elections, 24 January 1997
 Sunsari-5
 Kathmandu 1
 Rautahat-2
 Rupandehi-2
 Baitadi 1
 1999 by-elections, 9 December 1999
 Jhapa-6
 Morang-1
 Rautahat-4

 2009 by-elections, 10 April 2009
 Morang-5
 Morang-7
 Dhanusha-5
 Kaski 1
 Rolpa-2
 Kanchanpur-4

 2014 by-elections, 22 June 2014
 Kathmandu 2
 Chitwan-4
 Bardiya 1
 Kailali-6
 2015 Baglung 1 by-election, 11 April 2015
 2019 Kaski–2 by-election, 30 November 2019

National assembly elections 
According to Article 86 of the Constitution of Nepal 2015, the members of the National Assembly are elected every six years through an electoral college. In addition to this, one-third of the members are retired every two years for six years by drawing a lottery.

The electoral college consists of members of the provincial assembly and Chairperson/Mayor and Vice Chairperson/Deputy Mayor of the local bodies within the state. Each provincial assembly members vote has a weight of forty eight whereas each Chairperson/Mayor/Vice Chairperson/Deputy Mayor vote has a weight of eighteen. The electoral college elects 56 members to the National Assembly and three members, including one woman, are nominated by the president on the recommendation of the Government of Nepal.

Provincial assembly elections 
Following the dissolution of the provincial assembly all the members forming the Provincial Assembly are elected. The term for the Provincial Assembly is five years, except when dissolved earlier.

Candidates for each constituency are chosen by the political parties or stand as independents. Each constituency elects one member under the first past the post system of election. Since Nepal uses a parallel voting system, voters cast another ballot to elect members through the party-list proportional representation. The current constitution specifies that sixty percent of the members should be elected from the first past the post system and forty percent through the party-list proportional representation system. Women should account for one third of total members elected from each party and if one-third percentage are not elected, the party that fails to ensure so shall have to elect one-third of total number as women through the party-list proportional representation.

A party with an overall majority (more seats than all other parties combined) following an election forms the government. If a party has no outright majority, parties can seek to form coalitions.

The first provincial assembly elections in Nepal were held on 26 November and 7 December 2017.

By-election 

 2019 by-elections, 30 November 2019
 Bhaktapur 1(A), Bagmati Province
 Baglung 2(B), Gandaki Province
 Dang 3(B), Province No. 5

Local elections 

Elections are held for the municipal executive and municipal assemblies in municipalities and for the village executive and village assemblies in rural municipalities. The local executive consists of the elected mayor (or chair in rural municipalities), the deputy mayor (or the deputy chair in rural municipalities) and ward chairs of every ward in the local unit elected through first-past-the-post voting and, five female members (four in rural municipalities) and three members of the Dalit or minority community (two in rural municipalities) elected by the local assembly through single non-transferable vote. The assembly consists of the mayor (chair in the case of village assemblies), the deputy mayor (deputy chair in village assemblies), ward chais and four members from each ward of the municipality or rural municipality. Two ward members must be female, one of whom must belong to the dalit community or a minority group. All elections to the village assembly are held on the basis of first past the post system.

Referendums 
There has been one referendum held in Nepal, The 1980 governmental system referendum of 2 May 1980.

See also
Electoral calendar
Electoral system
Electoral roll
Election commission

References

External links
Election Commission
Adam Carr's Election Archive
The Carter Center information on Nepal
नेपालको निर्वाचनको इतिहास